The yellow-vented eremomela (Eremomela flavicrissalis) is a species of bird formerly placed in the "Old World warbler" assemblage, but now placed in the family Cisticolidae. It is found in dry savannas in Ethiopia, Kenya, Somalia, Tanzania, and Uganda.

References

yellow-vented eremomela
Birds of the Horn of Africa
yellow-vented eremomela
Taxonomy articles created by Polbot